The 8th Artistic Gymnastics World Championships were held in Lyon, in conjunction with that year's French Federal Festival, on May 22–23, 1926.

Medal table

Team All-round

Individual all-round

Pommel horse

Rings

Parallel bars

Horizontal bar

References 

World Artistic Gymnastics Championships
World Artistic Gymnastics Championships, 1926
Sports competitions in Lyon
World Artistic Gymnastics Championships, 1926
International gymnastics competitions hosted by France
20th century in Lyon